The Hat is a Canadian animated short film, directed by Michèle Cournoyer and released in 1999. Told entirely without dialogue, the film centres on an exotic dancer's flashbacks to childhood memories of sexual abuse.

The film was screened in the International Critics' Week section of the 2000 Cannes Film Festival. It was also screened at the 2000 Toronto International Film Festival, where it was named the winner of the award for Best Canadian Short Film.

It subsequently won the Jutra Award for Best Animated Short Film at the 3rd Jutra Awards in 2001, and was later named as one of the 100 best animated films of all time in a critics' survey by Variety.

References

External links
 

1999 films
1999 short films
Canadian animated short films
National Film Board of Canada animated short films
1990s Canadian films
Animated films without speech
Best Animated Short Film Jutra and Iris Award winners